Harmony is a Java-based software for creating high-definition music videos with 2D and 3D animations.  The application was developed by Digital Chaotics, a company based in San Jose, California and established in 2010 by Ken and Leanna Scott.

History
During a March 1, 2011 interview published by The LIST magazine, Ken explained how he initially got into music and digital entertainment.  According to Scott: 
“I came at it from both the art and the technology side. … I built one of the first digital audio synthesizers as an undergrad project back in 1979. It was a short jump from there to creating visuals with computers, too.” 

	Taking inspiration from Fantasia – which Scott calls, “The greatest music video of all time” – he began writing software code for Harmony in late 2009, finishing the project in mid-2010.  However, Scott has also said that the idea for Harmony began much earlier:

	I read a book in 1978 called Digital Harmony, by John H Whitney, Sr.  (Interestingly, he was the father of the president of Digital Productions.) He said that there was a kind of visual art based on motion, and proposed theories about the underlying mathematical structure of visual harmony. So there's the book, combined with my desire to create art with computers-add a taste or two of things commonly used by college students during the 70's - and lots of Pink Floyd. Add it all up, and the seeds for Harmony were planted. My friends in school and at Floating Point Systems listened to me ranting about "making music videos with computers" incessantly. I'm sure it was both maddening and fascinating to see.

Features
Harmony runs on Windows 7 and Windows Vista.  Currently, Digital Chaotics does not offer a macOS or Linux platform for the software. However, Harmony can be run on these platforms by running it on Windows in a virtual machine.

Harmony 2
On November 1, 2011, Digital Chaotics released the 2.0 version of the Harmony software.  Unlike the original version, the second release featured three product levels: Harmony 2 Express, Harmony 2 Pro, and Harmony 2 Extreme.  The "Express" version was positioned as an entry-level, free release to allow users a chance to "test-drive" the software.  The "Pro" version currently retails at $197, while the "Extreme" is priced at $397.  These two versions, aimed more towards VJ and Fulldome theater usage, featured additional software capability and features such as higher resolution, more video formatting options, and more camera angles.

Notes

See also
 VJ (video performance artist)
 Music visualization
 Software
 Technology
 Fulldome art (e.g., for planetarium domes)

References

External links 
 www.digitalchaotics.com

Video editing software